The women's freestyle 56 kilograms is a competition featured at the 1997 World Wrestling Championships, and was at the Clermont-Ferrand Sports Hall held in Clermont-Ferrand, France from 10 to 12 July 1997.

Results

Round 1

Round 2

Round 3

Round 4

Round 5

Finals

References

External links
UWW Database

Women's freestyle 56 kg